Kwimba District is one of the seven districts of the Mwanza Region of Tanzania. It is bordered to the north by the Magu District, to the east by Maswa District and Kishapu District, to the south by Shinyanga Rural District, and to the west by Misungwi District. The district seat is at Ngudu. Sumve is another important settlement in Kwimba District, hosting a hospital and large church.

The majority of the residents of Kwimba are Wasukuma from the Sukuma tribe and speak Sukuma along with Swahili. Most of the residents are engaged in the subsistence farming of rice, sweet potatoes, cassava, millet or maize.

As of 2012, the population of the Kwimba District was 406,509.

Livestock 
The 2002 Tanzania National Census showed the following statistics for livestock population in the Kwimba district:

 Cattle - 366,210
 Goats - 102,048
 Sheep - 77,333
 Donkeys - 4,416

Transport
Paved trunk road T8 from Shinyanga to Mwanza passes through Kwimba district from south to north.

The Central Line railway from Tabora to Mwanza passes through the district from east to west and there are three railway stations within the district's boundaries at the villages of Malya, Bukwimba and Mantare.

Administrative subdivisions
As of 2012, Kwimba District was divided into five divisions and 30 wards.

Divisions
 Ibindo
 Ngudu
 Ngulla
 Nyamilama
 Mwamashimba

Wards

 Bugando
 Bungulwa
 Bupamwa
 Fukalo
 Hungumalwa
 Igongwa
 Ilula Ward
 Iseni
 Kikubiji
 Lyoma
 Maligisu
 Malya Ward
 Mantare Ward
 Mhande
 Mwabomba
 Mwagi
 Mwakilambiti
 Mwamala
 Mwandu
 Mwang'halanga
 Mwankulwe
 Ng'hundi
 Ngudu
 Ngulla
 Nkalalo
 Nyambiti
 Nyamilama
 Shilembo
 Sumve
 Walla

References

Districts of Mwanza Region

sw:Kwimba